Sortavala (Finnish and); till 1918 Serdobol is a town in the Republic of Karelia, Russia, located at the northern tip of Lake Ladoga near the Finnish border,  west of Petrozavodsk, the capital city of the Republic of Karelia. In 2021 the population of Sortavala was 19,215.

History
The district of Sortavala was first recorded in Swedish documents dating to 1468. Russian documents first mention it as Serdovol or Serdobol in 1500. It was ceded to Sweden after the Ingrian War.

With the 1721 Treaty of Nystad, the settlement was joined to Russia along with the rest of Old Finland and was given the Russian name Serdobol. It became known for its marble and granite quarries which provided materials necessary for construction of imperial palaces in St. Petersburg and its neighborhood. In 1812, along with the rest of Viipuri Province, it was joined to the newly formed Grand Duchy of Finland.

In 1917, the town remained a part of independent Finland. It suffered extensively from mass Soviet bombardment during the Winter War, and through the Moscow Peace Treaty Finland was forced to cede the town to the Soviet Union. All of the population of the town was evacuated for the first time. Like the rest of Finnish Karelia, Sortavala was retaken by Finland during 1941–1944 (the period of the Continuation War) and most evacuees returned to rebuild their homes. However, after the armistice of 1944, the Finns were evacuated again and the town was ceded back empty of population. After the war, the town was resettled by the Russian and Karelian population.

Until 1940, the Ladoga shore southwest of Sortavala had been one of the very few relatively densely populated areas north of the Karelian Isthmus populated by Karelians.

Geography

Features
Paasonvuori,  79.2 m. hill near Sortavala

Climate

Administrative and municipal status
Within the framework of administrative divisions, it is, together with two urban-type settlements and forty-seven rural localities, incorporated as the town of republic significance of Sortavala—an administrative unit with the status equal to that of the districts. As a municipal division, the town of republic significance of Sortavala is incorporated as Sortavalsky Municipal District; the town of Sortavala and ten rural localities are incorporated within it as Sortavalskoye Urban Settlement. The remaining urban-type settlements and rural localities are incorporated within the municipal district into two urban settlements and two rural settlements.

Transportation

Sortavala is a railway station on the Khiytola-Matkaselkä railway.

Industry
Urban development enterprise - Karelian Industrial Complex.

Notable people
 Alexander Semyonovich Belyakov (born 1945), Russian politician
 Aarne Juutilainen (1904–1976), Finnish army captain, also known as nickname "The Terror of Morocco"
 Martti Kosma (1927–1999), former manager of the Finland national football team

Twin towns and sister cities
 Joensuu, Finland
 Kitee, Finland
 Bogen, Germany
 Serdobsk, Russia

See also
 Vyborg

References

Notes

Sources

Cities and towns in the Republic of Karelia
Grand Duchy of Finland
History of Karelia
Former municipalities of Finland
 
Renamed localities of Karelia